Robert Bourget-Pailleron (1897, Paris – 1970, Paris) was a 20th-century French journalist and writer, winner of the Prix Interallié in 1933 and the Grand prix du roman de l'Académie française in 1941.

Works 
1931: Champ secret
1932: Le Pouvoir absolu
1933: L'Homme du Brésil, Éditions Gallimard, Prix Interallié.
1936: Menaces de mort
1936: Les Clés de la caisse
1938: Conquête de la Bourgogne
1939: La Folie Hubert, Éditions Gallimard, Grand prix du roman de l'Académie française (1941).
1941: Le Chant du départ
1944: Les Journées de juin
1953: L'Enfant de minuit
1955: La Demoiselle de Viroflay
1956: Le Rendez-vous de Quimper
1958: Les Antiquaires
1961: La Colombe du Luxembourg

External links 
 Robert Bourget-Pailleron on Babelio
 Robert Bourget-Pailleron on the site of the Académie française
 Portrait
 Robert Bourget-Pailleron on the site of Éditions Gallimard

Lycée Condorcet alumni
20th-century French journalists
20th-century French writers
20th-century French male writers
Grand Prix du roman de l'Académie française winners
Prix Interallié winners
Writers from Paris
1897 births
1970 deaths
French male non-fiction writers